Robert Marsden (born 2 April 1959) is an English former cricketer.  Marsden was a right-handed batsman who allegedly bowled right-arm off break.  He was born in Hammersmith, London.

Marsden made his first-class debut for Oxford University against Warwickshire in 1979.  Marsden played 12 further first-class matches for the University, the last coming against Cambridge University in 1982.  In his 13 first-class matches, he scored 507 runs at a batting average of 23.04, with a highest score of 60.  His highest score came against Warwickshire in 1982. He did not bowl in first-class cricket. His son, Jonathan, also played first-class cricket.

References

External links
Robert Marsden at ESPNcricinfo
Robert Marsden at CricketArchive

1959 births
Living people
People from Hammersmith
Cricketers from Greater London
English cricketers
Oxford University cricketers
Alumni of Christ Church, Oxford